The Inter-territorial Catholic Bishops' Conference of The Gambia and Sierra Leone (ITCABIC) is the episcopal conference of the Catholic Church in the Sierra Leone and The Gambia.

The current president is The Most Reverend  Patrick Daniel Koroma, Bishop of Kenema

History
Founded in 1971, it originally included the Bishops of Sierra Leone, The Gambia and Liberia. The Catholic Bishops' Conference of Liberia was established in 1998. Today, the Inter-territorial Catholic Bishops' Conference of The Gambia and Sierra Leone consists of all active and retired members of the Catholic hierarchy (i.e., diocesan, coadjutor, and auxiliary bishops and the ordinary of the Personal Ordinariate of the Chair of Saint Peter) in Sierra Leone and The Gambia.

Caritas Sierra Leone
Established in 1981,  Caritas Sierra Leone was formed by the Catholic Bishops Conference of Sierra Leone for the purpose of serving as the relief and development branch of the Catholic Church in Sierra Leone.

Caritas Sierra Leone was active during the Sierra Leone Civil War providing shelter, nourishment, trauma counselling and advocacy for child soldiers.

In post war Sierra Leone, Caritas participated in peace building actions but has also worked with humanitarian relief, youth empowerment, gender equality, poverty eradication and HIV/AIDS prevention.

Regions
The dioceses of the Sierra Leone and The Gambia are grouped into 5 regions: and the Metropolitan Freetown, Bo, Kenema, Makeni and Banjul.

Presidents of the Bishops' Conference
1971-1975: Thomas Joseph Brosnahan, Archbishop of Freetown and Bo
1975-1977: Michael Joseph Moloney, Bishop of Banjul
1977-1980: Augusto Fermo Azzolini, Bishop of Makeni
1980-1983: Joseph Henry Ganda, Archbishop of Freetown and Bo
1983-1986: Michael Kpakala Francis, Archbishop of Monrovia
1986-1989: Michael J. Cleary, Bishop of Banjul
1989-1992: Boniface Nyema Dalieh, Bishop of Cape Palmas
1992-1995: John C. O'Riordan, Bishop of Kenema
1995-1998: Benedict Dotu Sekey, Bishop of Gbarnga
1998-2001: George Biguzzi, Bishop of Makeni
2001-2003: Joseph Henry Ganda, Archbishop of Freetown and Bo
2003-2004: Michael J. Cleary, Bishop of Banjul
2004-2010: George Biguzzi, Bishop of Makeni
From 2010: Patrick Daniel Koroma, Bishop of Kenema

† = deceased

See also

 Catholic Church in Sierra Leone
 Collegiality in the Catholic Church
 Historical list of the Catholic bishops of the Sierra Leone
 History of Roman Catholicism in the Sierra Leone
 List of Catholic bishops of the Sierra Leone
 List of Catholic dioceses in Gambia and Sierra Leone
 Caritas Sierra Leone
 The Missionary Sisters of the Holy Rosary
 Christ the King College

See also
Episcopal conference
List of Roman Catholic dioceses in Sierra Leone (4)
List of Roman Catholic dioceses in the Gambia (1)

References

External links
 http://catholicchurchsl.org/index.php
 http://www.gcatholic.org/dioceses/country/SL.htm
 http://www.catholic-hierarchy.org/country/sl.html 
 http://www.gcatholic.org/dioceses/country/GM.htm
 http://www.catholic-hierarchy.org/country/gm.html 
 https://www.caritas.org/where-caritas-work/africa/sierra-leone/

Gambia
Catholic Church in the Gambia
Catholic Church in Liberia
Catholic Church in Sierra Leone

it:Chiesa cattolica in Sierra Leone#Conferenza episcopale